Vryses is a village in Crete, Greece, also is the capital in the municipality of Apokoronas. It has a population of 740 inhabitants according to the 2011 census. It is now a popular tourist destination that has maintained its Cretan character.

On New Year's Day 2010 the meteorological station of the National Observatory of Athens recorded a maximum temperature of 30.4°C in Vryses which is the highest January temperature ever recorded in Greece.

References

Populated places in Chania (regional unit)